Leonidas Howard Sr. (1849 – March 8, 1912), usually known as Leon Howard, was a laborer in Memphis, Tennessee who is believed to have been an ex-slave) and served one term as a member of the Tennessee House of Representatives for the 43rd General Assembly (1883–84). A Republican, he was African-American. He eventually moved to Bakersfield, California
 where he died at his home March 8, 1912.

See also
African Americans in Tennessee
African-American officeholders during and following the Reconstruction era

References

1849 births
1912 deaths
Republican Party members of the Tennessee House of Representatives
African-American state legislators in Tennessee
People from Bakersfield, California
People from Memphis, Tennessee
19th-century American politicians
African-American politicians during the Reconstruction Era
American freedmen
20th-century African-American people